Christopher Oluwole Rotimi (born 20 February 1935) is a retired Nigerian Army brigadier general, diplomat and politician, he served during the Nigerian Civil War, and was the Governor of Western State while Nigeria was under military rule from 1971 to 1975. Oluwole Rotimi became the Nigerian Ambassador to the United States in 2007.

Early life
Oluwole Rotimi was born February 20, 1935, in Abeokuta, Nigeria to a Yoruban family. He attended Agooko Methodist School, Lisabi school, Olowogbowo Methodist School as well as Kings College Lagos, after which he earned a BA at the University College Ibadan.

Oluwole Joined the Nigerian Army in 1960 and served as part of the United Nations Peacekeeping Force in the Democratic Republic of the Congo. He rose to become the first African Deputy Quartermaster General and the third non-white Quartermaster General of the Nigerian Army in 1966. During the Nigerian Civil War Oluwole Rotimi provided logistics support for the Federal Government's war efforts. He became the commander of the Ibadan Garrison between 1969 and 1970.

Governor of Western State
After the war Oluwole Rotimi became the Military Governor of Western State of Nigeria in 1971, under Yakubu Gowon in succession to Brigadier Adeyinka Adebayo. During his time as governor, the state had peace and development.

Projects As Governor
 The Cement Factory at Shagamu
 The Wire and Cable Factory in Ibadan
 The Ceramic Factory in Abeokuta
 The Wood Processing Factory in Ondo
 The palm oil Mill at Okitipupa.

1975 coup
In 1975, Oluwole Rotimi was removed from office as governor of Western Nigeria after the 1975 coup d'état. The following administration led by General Murtala Mohammed, commissioned a panel to investigate corruption amongst that past governors of the past administration. Oluwole Rotimi, together with Mobolaji Johnson-Brigadier (Lagos State Governor) was one of the only two governors exonerated.

Under Obasanjo
In 1999 Gen. Oluwole Rotimi was appointed by the President Olusegun Obasanjo as the Head of a Commission of Inquiry for the Investigation of Federal Government Landed Property.

Oluwole Rotimi was honored with a National Award of Commander of the Order of the Niger (CON) in 2003.

In 2005, Oluwole Rotimi was appointed a member of the National Constitutional Review Conference representing his home state-Ogun State.

Ambassador
Oluwole Rotimi became the Ambassador to the United States of America in March 2008. He was sacked from the post in March 2009 by the President of Nigeria, Umaru Yar'Adua after allegations of insubordination.

References

Max Siollun. Oil, Politics and Violence: Nigeria's Military Coup Culture 1966–1976. Algora Publishing, 2009  pp. 30, 70, 92, 186–187, 223.

Nigerian generals
Nigerian diplomats
Yoruba military personnel
1935 births
Living people
Politicians from Abeokuta
King's College, Lagos alumni
University of Ibadan alumni
Nigerian military governors
Ambassadors of Nigeria to the United States
Commanders of the Order of the Niger
Military personnel of the Nigerian Civil War
Yoruba politicians
Brigadier generals
People from Abeokuta